The Michael J. Fox Show is an American sitcom television series starring Michael J. Fox, that aired on NBC in the United States from September 26, 2013, to January 23, 2014, as part of the 2013–14 American television season. Fox made his regular return to television for the first time since he was on ABC's Spin City. It was his second NBC series, as he appeared on that network's sitcom Family Ties from 1982 to 1989 as Alex P. Keaton.

On February 5, 2014, NBC cancelled the series due to the 2014 Winter Olympics. A representative for NBC later stated in regards to the show, "It's not cancelled. We are looking for a place on the schedule after April 3." Despite this, the remaining episodes never aired in the U.S. and, on May 10, 2014, NBC officially canceled the show after one season. The remaining seven episodes were aired in Australia on Nine Network from March 12 to April 23, 2014.

Premise
After being diagnosed with Parkinson's disease, Mike Henry had to give up his career as a news anchor for New York's WNBC and focus on his health and his family. Four years later, Mike decides to get back to work and struggles between family and career.

Cast and characters

Main
 Michael J. Fox as Michael "Mike" Henry
 Betsy Brandt as Annie Henry, Mike's wife
 Juliette Goglia as Eve Henry, Mike's and Annie's daughter
 Conor Romero as Ian Henry, Mike's and Annie's elder son
 Jack Gore as Graham Henry, Mike's and Annie's younger son
 Katie Finneran as Leigh Henry, Mike's sister
 Ana Nogueira as Kay Costa, Mike's assistant
 Wendell Pierce as Harris Green, Mike's boss and best friend

Recurring
 Anne Heche as Susan Rodriguez-Jones, Mike's coworker
 Jason Kravits as Doug, Mike's coworker
 Peter Vack as Andreas
 Brooke Shields as Deborah, Ian's girlfriend
 Craig Bierko as Bill, the Henrys' neighbor
 David Furr as Andy, the Henrys' doorman
 Alice Kremelberg as Reese, Ian's girlfriend (later ex)

Guest
 Tracy Pollan as Kelly, the Henrys' neighbor
 Christopher Lloyd as Principal McTavish, Annie's coworker
 Candice Bergen as Beth Henry, Mike and Leigh's mother
 Charles Grodin as Steve Henry, Mike and Leigh's father
 Richard Kind as Mr. Norwood, the Henrys' neighbor and a former mobster
 Vandit Bhatt as Kevin, Kay's ex-fiancé
 Sting as himself
 Chris Christie as himself
 Matt Lauer as himself
 Al Roker as himself

Development and production
In August 2012, NBC gave a straight-to-series order for the series.

Episodes

Reception
The show had a positive reception from critics, with many praising Michael J. Fox and Betsy Brandt's performances. It was called one of six new shows to keep an eye on of the 2013-14 television season by Entertainment Weekly. The New York Times found the show distinctly unfunny, remarking that something felt "off".

In Australia the series premiered in double episodes, each scoring the highest rated overnight subscription television figures of the night (77,000 and 73,000 respectively). However, successive episodes saw a significant drop in ratings.

Awards and nominations
On June 25, 2013, the series was honored, along with five others, with the Critics' Choice Television Award for Most Exciting New Series. Fox was nominated for a Golden Globe.

Broadcast
In Australia, the series premiered on Universal Channel on January 15, 2014.

Home media
On July 7, 2015, Sony Pictures Home Entertainment released The Michael J. Fox Show - The Complete 1st Season on DVD in Region 1.

References

External links

2010s American mockumentary television series
2010s American single-camera sitcoms
2013 American television series debuts
2014 American television series endings
Television series by Sony Pictures Television
English-language television shows
Television series about families
Television series about television
Television shows about disability
Television shows set in New York City
Television shows filmed in New York (state)
Television news sitcoms
NBC original programming